Birigui is  a city in the state of São Paulo, Brazil. The city is located on the northwest of the state and has 124,883 inhabitants (IBGE/2020) and 530.9 km2 of area.
The name Birigui comes from the Tupi–Guarani language and means "little fly". It refers to the Lutzomyia fly, very common at the area.
The city is known for its children's footwear industry.

History

As the major cities of the region, Birigui, emerged and grew from the Northwest Railway, built at the beginning of the century. In the beginning was a key in the clearing, located between the kilometers 259 and 261 that in 1908 happened to be a point of stop of locomotives. The town was founded on December 7, 1911 by Mr. Nicolau da Silva Nunes, an entrepreneurial Portuguese native of the Parish of Moutamorta, Trás-os-Montes.

The founder maintained in the future city the denomination given by the workers of the local railroad. The name Birigui originated in the Tupi-Guarani language, the Indians used this word as the meaning of "fly that always comes" to a tiny hematophagous mosquito that bothered everyone and was quite frequent in the region.
Nicolau da Silva Nunes met the region attracted by a newspaper article, on the first visit he was charmed by the exuberance and fertility of the lands of the region, especially those that involved the key of Birigui. He bought 400 bushels for himself and his representatives, Antonio Gonçalves Torres and Afonso Garcia Franco, and when he returned to Sales de Oliveira, the city where he lived, he placed the lots on sale.

Nicolau da Silva Nunes envisioned that those forests, the fertile land and the clear waters emanated progress. The only difficulty in his enterprise was his neighbors, the Crowned Indians.
To avoid frightening his customers, he used trickery, he asked, until they had erased the Indians' trail and moved in two wagons to demonstrate security.
However, neither the hostility of the Indians nor the presence of the small mosquito discouraged the first inhabitants. The first residents who accompanied the founder were Francisco Galindo Romero, Manoel Inacio, Francisco Galindo de Castro and his wife, Dona Antonia Real Dias, the first woman to live here.
The first house was erected made of mud, at the confluence of the present Silvares and Founders' Streets. Lucas Scarpin, Antonio Simões, Faustino Segura, Ricardo Del Nery, João Galo, France Contel and Giuzeppe Fonzar were some of the pioneers.
In 1912, Birigui gains another inhabitant, José Cordeiro, a typical bandeirante captain who leaves Lençóis Paulista with his expedition and joins the town. Manuel Bento da Cruz founded the company of Lands, Timber and Colonization São Paulo, with as pioneers Roberto Clark and James Mellor.

With the passage of time, the crop is occupying what was bush. Our coffee cycle is coming. With this rampant progress, Birigui achieved his emancipation on December 8, 1921, only ten years after its foundation. In February 1922 the first town hall of Birigui was elected, a month later Archibald Thomas Clark took office as the first mayor.

Economy
The Tertiary sector corresponds to 71.12% of Birigui's GDP. The Secondary sector is 27.07% of the GDP and the Primary sector corresponds to 1.8%.

Birigui is recognized for being the most important center of children's shoes production in Brazil with a production of 57 million pairs in the year of 2006. In the same year it had 159 industries in the children' shoe's segment and their profit was over 800 million reais (R$). Among all these industries there are over 18 thousand workers which consist in 60% of the jobs offered in all the city.

Footwear industry (2014/2015)
 350 factories
 Daily output 250,501 pairs
 Annual production 58.2 million pairs / year
 Annual export 2.9%
 Employees in the footwear industry 19,490
 50 shops of factories (approximately)

Geographical Aspects
Located under the latitude 21º17'19" S and longitude  50º20'24" W.
Geographic space
Region: 9th Administrative Region.
Location: Northwest of the State of São Paulo.
Highways: Marechal Rondon, Engineer Gabriel Melhado Filho and Senator Teotônio Vilela.
Boundaries: Northeast - Buritama; East - Crowned; Southwest - Bilac; West - Araçatuba.
Distance to:
 São Paulo - 521 km
 Araçatuba - 11 km
 Bilac - 19 km
 Buritama - 40 km
 Coroados - 9 km

Weather
According to Köppen climate classification Birigui has a humid subtropical climate. Highest 36 °C and Lowest 4 °C.

Hydrography
Rivers: Tietê, Baixotes, Grande, Tabapuã, Ribeirão Baguaçu, Da Colônia, Do Imbé, Barro Preto, Água Branca

Demography
Population: 108 728 inhabitants (IBGE/2010)
Demographic density (inhabitants/km2): 204.79
Infantile mortality until 1 year old(in each thousand children): 9,64
Life expectancy (years old): 74,96
Fecundity rate (children by woman): 2,01
Human development index (HDI): 0,829
HDI Income: 0,761
HDI Longevity: 0,833
HDI Education: 0,893
(Source: IPEADATA)

Ethnography
Colour/race Percentage
White 78,0%
Black 1,8%
Brown 18,8%
Yellow 1,1%
Amerindian 0,2%

Education
The city has 10 day-nurseries, 21 EMEI (Municipal School of Infantile Education), 11 EMEFs (Municipal School of Basic Education), 5 State Schools of Basic Education, 7 State High Schools, 5 private High Schools and 3 universities.

Sports
Soccer and biribol, an aquatic version of volleyball are the most popular sports in the city. The soccer team, Bandeirante Esporte Clube, was founded on March 11, 1923 and its first president was José Troncoso, who currently names a street in the city. In 1987 the team played professionally in the Premier League of Campeonato Paulista (a championship in the state of São Paulo)

Biribol was invented in the city by the Teacher Dario Miguel Pedro.

Transportation

SP-300 Rodovia Marechal Cândido Rondon
SP-461 Rodovia Gabriel Melhado
 Estrada BIGI-458
 Estrada José Gusman

References

External links
 Prefecture of Birigui
 Birigui's Municipal Chamber

 
Populated places established in 1911
1911 establishments in Brazil
Portuguese words affected by the 1990 spelling reform